is a passenger railway station in located in the city of Hannan, Osaka Prefecture, Japan, operated by West Japan Railway Company (JR West).

Lines

Station layout
The station consists of two island platforms connected to the station building by a footbridge. The station his unattended, and is administrated by Izumi-Sunagawa Station.

Platforms

History
Yamanakadani Station opened on 16 June 1930. With the privatization of the Japan National Railways (JNR) on 1 April 1987, the station came under the aegis of the West Japan Railway Company.

Station numbering was introduced in March 2018 with Yamanakadani being assigned station number JR-R50.

Passenger statistics
In fiscal 2019, the station was used by an average of 179 passengers daily (boarding passengers only).

Surrounding Area
 Yamanaka Gorge
 Yamanaka Shrine 
 Jifuku-ji
 Sakaibashi, --Prefectural border with Wakayama

See also
List of railway stations in Japan

References

External links

 Yamanakadani Station Official Site

Railway stations in Osaka Prefecture
Railway stations in Japan opened in 1930
Hannan, Osaka